Zafar or MIG-S-2600 is a class of fast patrol boat operated by the Navy of the Islamic Revolutionary Guard Corps.

History 
According to the Conway's All the World's Fighting Ships, Iran purchased some Chaho-class fast attack crafts from North Korea in 1987. Shahid Joolaee Marine Industries of the Marine Industries Organization has built vessels similar to the class with a different superstructure and a raised mast in order to improve radar capabilities. A 2007 report by the Israeli Institute for National Security Studies suggests that Iran has exported the vessel to Syria.

References 

Fast patrol boat classes of the Navy of the Islamic Revolutionary Guard Corps
Ships built at Shahid Julaei shipyard
Iran–North Korea military relations
Iran–Syria military relations